Sălcuța is a village in Căușeni District, Moldova.

Geography

The village is located in the south-eastern part of the country, about 3 km as the crow flies from the border with Ukraine. In the area immediately north of the village flows the river Botna, a tributary of the Dnestr and the sixth river in Moldova in order of length.

Climate 
The climate of the area can be classified as continental and has strong seasonal temperature variations, with temperatures that can reach 40 ° C in summer and drop to -25 ° C in winter.

References

Villages of Căușeni District